Chronologie (English title: Chronology) is the eleventh studio album by French electronic musician and composer Jean-Michel Jarre, and was released on Disques Dreyfus with license to Polydor in 1993. Chronologie peaked at Number 11 in the UK charts and the album cover art was created by long-time collaborator Michel Granger.

Chronologie was performed at a series of 16 performances across Europe called Europe in Concert. These were on a smaller scale than his previous concerts, featuring a miniature skyline, laser imaging and fireworks. Locations included Lausanne, Mont St Michel, London, Manchester, Barcelona, Seville and the Versailles Palace near Paris.

Composition 
The album features Jarre's traditional collection of instruments like the ARP 2600 and Minimoog, as well as newer synthesisers such as the Roland JD-800 and the Kurzweil K2000. Chronologie was recorded and mixed in Croissy studio.

Track listing 
All tracks by Jean Michel Jarre.

Personnel 
Personnel Lister in album liner notes:
Jean Michel Jarre – Digisequencer, Kurzweil K2000, Mini Moog, ARP 2600, Akai MPC60, AKAI S 1000, EMS Synthi AKS, JD 800, Korg O1/W, Roland TR-909, DR 660, Synthex, Eminent 310, JP 8, DJ 70, Vocalist, Fairlight CMI
Francis Rimbert – additional keyboards
Michel Geiss – additional keyboards, artistic collaboration
Dominique Perrier – additional keyboards
Patrick Rondat – guitar
Patrick Pelamourges – technical assistance

Charts

Weekly charts

Year-end charts

Certifications

References

External links 
 Chronologie at Discogs

1993 albums
Jean-Michel Jarre albums